John Joseph Connolly (August 24, 1900 – July 16, 1967) was a Canadian ice hockey player who played in the professional leagues during the 1920s.

Connolly played Major League hockey with the 1925–26 Vancouver Maroons of the Western Canada Hockey League.

Career statistics

References

External links

1900 births
1967 deaths
Canadian ice hockey right wingers
Central Hockey League (1925–1926) players
Ice hockey people from Manitoba
Prairie Hockey League players
St. Paul Saints (AHA) players
Vancouver Maroons players
Western Canada Hockey League players
Windsor Bulldogs (CPHL) players